David Doyle is an American writer on historic military vehicles, hardware, aircraft and warships, who has written over 175 books, published with a variety of publishers, many of which are listed below. Since 2015, he also sells through his own website.

Biography
Doyle's interest in military vehicles was sparked as a boy, when his father gave him a ride in an M211, 2½-Ton, 6×6, GMC Truck. Years later, David began restoring, researching and collecting post-World War II vehicles, with an emphasis on Vietnam-era special-purpose trucks, motivated by a ".. life-long interest in history, things mechanical and the sacrifices of [U.S.] servicemen .."

Doyle started writing contributions for enthusiast publications, focusing on historic military vehicle restoration, with articles appearing regularly in the U.S., U.K., France and Poland by 1999. The articles led to books, first of all the 2003 catalog of U.S. historic military vehicles.

Doyle is a member of the Military Vehicle Preservation Association (MVPA), American Truck History Society (ATHS), The Studebaker Drivers Club and former member of the Society for the Preservation and Appreciation of Antique Motor Fire Apparatus. He was also a regular contributor for Military Vehicles Magazine and Army Motors, prior to becoming editor of History in Motion (formerly Supply Line), the newsletter of the Military Vehicle Preservation Association.

In 2015, Doyle received the MVPA's 'Bart Vanderveen Award' for his contributions the historic preservation of military vehicles worldwide.
In 2017, Doyle purchased the remaining inventory of Ampersand Publishing co., which had been the publisher of Military Miniatures in Review magazine, and over 25 of Doyle's books.

Selected publications

See also
 Jim Allen - writer for 4x4 magazines and author of books on four-wheeling and technical topics.
 Steven Zaloga – an American historian, defense consultant, and author on military technology

References

American military historians
American technology writers
Living people
Year of birth missing (living people)